Anhaloniopsis is a genus of flowering plants belonging to the family Cactaceae.

Its native range is Peru.

Species:

Anhaloniopsis madisoniorum

References

Cactoideae
Cactoideae genera